The Sciarra Madonna is an oil on canvas painting attributed to Titian, signed "TITIANVS" and dated to circa 1540. It is now in the Museu Nacional d'Art de Catalunya in Barcelona.

This attribution was accepted by Cavalcaselle, abandoned and then revived by Suida, who noted how the Madonna's pose echoed that in Rest on the Flight into Egypt (Longleat House). Tietze and Berenson argue it is a work by the school of Titian rather than an autograph work.

History 
It is first recorded in the Palazzo Sciarra in Ferrara, from which it was bought in Rome by Francis Cowper. It then passed from his descendants to the Thyssen collection.

Sources
http://www.museothyssen.org/en/thyssen/ficha_obra/133
 Francesco Valcanover, L'opera completa di Tiziano, Rizzoli, Milano 1969.

1528 paintings
Sciarra
Paintings in the collection of the Museu Nacional d'Art de Catalunya